Charles R. Seeling (April 4, 1895 – October 13, 1951) was an American cinematographer and producer and film director of the silent era.

Selected filmography
 The Enchanted Barn (1919)
 The Wishing Ring Man (1919)
Across the Border (1922)
 The Cowboy King (1922)
 Cyclone Jones (1923)
 The Tango Cavalier (1923)
 The Apache Dancer  (1923)
 The Purple Dawn (1923)
 Yankee Madness (1924)
 Stop at Nothing (1924)
 Rose of the Desert (1925)

References

Bibliography
 Golden, Eve. John Gilbert: The Last of the Silent Film Stars. University Press of Kentucky, 2013.

External links

1895 births
1951 deaths
American film directors
American film producers
American cinematographers
People from New Jersey